Muricopsis principensis is a species of small sea snail, a marine gastropod mollusks in the family Muricidae, the rock snails.

This species occurs on the island of Príncipe, São Tomé and Príncipe, where it is endemic.

References

Muricidae
Endemic fauna of Príncipe
Invertebrates of São Tomé and Príncipe
Gastropods described in 1991
Taxonomy articles created by Polbot